Henry North (1556–1620), of Wickhambrook and Mildenhall, Suffolk, was an English politician.

He was a Member (MP) of the Parliament of England for Cambridge in 1584, and for Cambridgeshire in 1597.

References

1556 births
1620 deaths
People from the Borough of St Edmundsbury
English MPs 1584–1585
English MPs 1597–1598
People from Mildenhall, Suffolk